Virginia's 96th House of Delegates district elects one of the 100 members of the Virginia House of Delegates, the lower house of the state's bicameral legislature. District 96 includes parts of James City County and York County. It is currently represented by Republican Amanda Batten.

List of delegates

References

External links
  map.

Virginia House of Delegates districts

York County, Virginia
James City County, Virginia